Neapterolelaps is a genus of wasps belonging to the family Pteromalidae.

The species of this genus are found in Australia.

Species:
 Neapterolelaps leai Dodd, 1924 
 Neapterolelaps lodgei Girault, 1913 
 Neapterolelaps nigrisaepta (Girault, 1929) 
 Neapterolelaps paraeneiceps Sureshan & Binoy, 2019

References

Pteromalidae
Hymenoptera genera